Leo Ravilo (25 September 1907 – 11 October 1975) was a Finnish sports shooter. He competed in the 25 m pistol event at the 1948 Summer Olympics.

References

1907 births
1975 deaths
Finnish male sport shooters
Olympic shooters of Finland
Shooters at the 1948 Summer Olympics
Sportspeople from Turku